On Your Side is Gerald Walker's third official mixtape and his first collaborative release with Wiz Khalifa's and Taylor Gang Records producer, Cardo.

Background
The mixtape includes 14 original tracks and is entirely produced by Cardo & Sledgren of the Taylor Gang. Features and appearances included rappers  Trae The Truth, Rockie Fresh, EL Prez and Bryant Stewart. On Your Side was created as an EP. Later the artist decided to release it as a free mixtape. On April 1, the first song in support of On Your Side titled "We've Got a Situation on our Hands" was leaked onto the internet. However, the lead single "We Don't Give a F**K" wasn't leaked until April 8 on XXL Magazine. The final single titled "Money On The Dresser" which features, Trae the Truth, was leaked May 5, 2011. The mixtape was produced by Real Monstas Music Group and released on One Step at a Time Music on May 6, 2011, via Twitter.

Track listing

Credits
 Gerald Walker (Vocals)
 Cardo (Production)
 Sledgren (Production)

Production
Producers: Ray Johnson, Gerald Walker, Edward Murray
Features: Donald Pullen, Frazier Thompson, El Prez, Bryant Stewart, Taylor Kane
Executive producers: Sascha Stone, Ronald La Tour, Edward Murray, Gerald Walker & Mohammad Shah
Recording director: Barron 'Slot-A' Bollar
Engineer: Jordan Regester 
Mixing: Barron 'Slot-A' Bollar
Marketing: ScoreMore Shows
Art direction: 3rd ID Clothing
Video Direction: Think Ahead Productions

References

2011 mixtape albums
Gerald Walker albums
Albums produced by Cardo